Max Touloute (born 27 April 1990 in Les Cayes) is a Haitian footballer who last played for Florida Tropics SC in the Major Arena Soccer League.

Career

College and semi-professional
Touloute played college soccer for the Fort Wayne Mastodons of Indiana University – Purdue University Fort Wayne for four seasons between 2008 and 2011. In total, Touloute made 67 appearances, tallying 32 goals and 14 assists for the team. Touloute earned multiple honours throughout his college career, including being named Summit League Offensive Player of the Year in 2011. While in college, Touloute also played semi-professional soccer for Premier Development League clubs Michigan Bucks in 2010 and Vermont Voltage in 2011. He made seven league appearances for both clubs, scoring one goal for Michigan.

Professional
Following college, Touloute signed for UMF Tindastóll of the 1. deild karla, the second tier of the Icelandic football league system, on 1 May 2012. In his one season with the club, Touloute tallied 6 goals in 17 matches. The player also made two Icelandic Cup appearances for the club, scoring one goal, during the season. Toulouse left the club on 5 September of the same year. The following season, he transferred to BÍ/Bolungarvík, also of the 1. deild karla, signing on 14 March 2013. He remained with this club for one season also, scoring 5 goals in 15 matches.

Touloute returned to the United States in 2014, signing for Reading United and returning to the Premier Development League in the process. Throughout the 2014 season, Touloute made 5 appearances and scored 1 goal. Following his departure from Reading, it was announced on 13 March 2015 that Touloute had signed with the Pittsburgh Riverhounds of the United Soccer League for the 2015 season. He made his league debut for the club on 28 March 2015, coming on as a second-half substitute for Lebogang Moloto in the eventual 5-2 victory over the Harrisburg City Islanders to open the season. Touloute scored his first goal for the club on the next matchday, scoring Pittsburgh's only goal of a 1–2 defeat to the Rochester Rhinos on 4 April 2015.

International
Touloute was called up by the Haitian national team for a 2012 Caribbean Cup qualification match against Guyana on 14 November 2012. Touloute was on the bench for the match but was an unused substitute. For the other two qualification matches of the round, Touloute was left off of the gameday roster and remained in the stands. Haiti head coach Israel Blake Cantero called Touloute into the squad for the final round of the 2012 Caribbean Cup after the nation qualified but the player had to remain in the United States to finish exams to graduate from his university. He has not yet been capped by Haiti.

References

External links

Caribbean Football Database profile
IPFW Mastodons profile

1990 births
Living people
Haitian footballers
Haitian expatriate footballers
Purdue Fort Wayne Mastodons men's soccer players
Flint City Bucks players
Vermont Voltage players
Reading United A.C. players
Pittsburgh Riverhounds SC players
Florida Tropics SC players
Association football forwards
Expatriate soccer players in the United States
USL League Two players
USL Championship players
Major Arena Soccer League players
Missouri Comets players
Ungmennafélagið Tindastóll men's football players
People from Les Cayes